In chemistry, the burn rate (or burning rate) is a measure of the linear combustion rate of a compound or substance such as a candle or a solid propellant. It is measured in length over time, such as millimeters per second or inches per second. Among the variables affecting burn rate are pressure and temperature. Burn rate is an important parameter especially in the area of propellants because it determines the rate at which exhaust gases are generated from the burning propellant, which in turn decides the rate of flow through the nozzle. The thrust generated in the rocket of missile depends on this rate of flow. Thus, knowing the burn rate of a propellant and how it changes under various conditions is of fundamental importance in the successful design of a solid rocket motor. The concept of burn rate is also relevant in case of liquid propellants.

Measurement
One device for measuring burning rate is a V-shaped metal channel about 1–2 feet long wherein a sample is placed, with a cross-sectional dimension of approximately 6 mm or 1/4in. The sample is ignited on one end and time is measured until the flame front gets to the other end. Burn rate (typically expressed in mm/s, or in/s) is the sample length over time at a given pressure and temperature. For solid fuel propellant, the most common method of measuring burn rate is the Crawford Type Strand Burning Rate Bomb System (also known as the Crawford Burner or Strand Burner), as described in MIL-STD-286C.

Characterization 
A substance is characterized through burn rate vs pressure chart and burn rate vs temperature chart.
 Higher burn rate than the speed of sound in the material (usually several km/s): "detonation"
 A few meters per second: "deflagration"
 A few centimeters per second: "burn" or "smolder"
 0.01 mm/s to 100 mm/s: "decomposing rapidly" to characterise it.

However, there is difference in opinion in differentiating the three in absence of firm numbers at a given pressure or temperature.

See also
 Detonation velocity

References

Combustion
Temporal rates